Oleksandr Serhiyovych Protsyuk (born 1 February 1989) is a Ukrainian footballer who played for Kharkiv as a midfielder.

External links

1989 births
Living people
Ukrainian footballers
FC Kharkiv players

Association football midfielders
Footballers from Kyiv